The 1926 Nova Scotia hurricane (also known as the 1926 Great August Gale) was one of the deadliest Canadian hurricanes in the 20th century. The second tropical cyclone and second hurricane of the season, the storm developed from a trough situated well east of the Leeward Islands on July 29. Over the next few days, it moved west-northwest, becoming a tropical storm by July 31. The cyclone turned to the northwest on August 1 and began strengthening rapidly, reaching hurricane intensity by the early afternoon. The next day, it became a major hurricane—equivalent to Category 3 intensity on the modern-day Saffir–Simpson hurricane wind scale. Over the next few days, the storm's track varied between north-northwest and northwest. The hurricane then began weakening as it curved northward. The storm began losing tropical characteristics while approaching Atlantic Canada, transitioning into an extratropical cyclone on August 8.

In Atlantic Canada, the cyclone sank several ships and boats offshore Nova Scotia, including the schooners Sylvia Mosher and Sadie Knickle. A total of 55–58 deaths occurred, including at least 49 from those two ships crashing ashore Sable Island. On land, the storm downed trees and electrical poles in Nova Scotia, damaging some homes and leaving telephone service outages. Crops and fruit trees were also damaged. High winds interrupted telegraph communications in Newfoundland. Despite the number of fatalities, little was done to mitigate for a tropical cyclone prior to the hurricane in August 1927, which caused more than three times as many deaths.

Meteorological history

The cyclone initially moved west-northwestward and strengthened, becoming a tropical storm by 00:00 UTC on July 31. On August 1, the cyclone turned northwestward and began strengthening rapidly. Based on ship reports of hurricane force and near-hurricane-force winds, it estimated the storm intensified into a Category 1 hurricane by 18:00 UTC. Early on August 2, the system intensified into a Category 2 hurricane. At 12:00 UTC, the cyclone became a major hurricane—with winds of at least —equivalent to Category 3 intensity on the modern-day Saffir–Simpson scale. Around that time, a ship recorded a barometric pressure of  – the lowest known pressure in association with the storm. However, no ships entered the eye of the hurricane and sampled the lowest pressure in the storm.

Over the next few days, the track of the hurricane varied between north-northwest and northwest. Around 00:00 UTC on August 8, the storm weakened into a Category 1 hurricane and transitioned into an extratropical cyclone about six hours later.

Preparations
Due to the possibility of gale-force winds occurring just offshore Maine, storm warnings were issued between Portland and Eastport. Shipping ahead of the hurricane received repeated warnings broadcast by both American and Canadian weather officials. However, the majority of fishing vessels in Atlantic Canada in this period did not have radios, leaving the large fishing fleet on the offshore banks unaware of the approaching disaster.

Impact

About this time, five ocean liners near each other encountered the storm; some portholes on the Orca were damaged and 15 passengers were treated for cuts, bruises, and contusions. Off Nova Scotia, the cyclone produced an unspecified number of casualties, including the sinking of the schooners Sylvia Mosher and Sadie Knickle. Five people died and one other person was injured after the Norwegian steamer Ringhord capsized near Scatarie Island. One person also drowned after the Edith Newhall sank. Many other boats and ships in and near Nova Scotia capsized or ran aground, including 11 ships at New Harbour, 2 motorboats at Mosher's Head, another motorboat at Spectacle Island, and several at the Chester harbor. Additionally, at least nine small boats, four schooners, a skiff, and several other vessels were wrecked in Newfoundland and Labrador. Overall, between 55 and 58 deaths occurred at sea, including 49 from the Sylvia Mosher and the Sadie Knickle crashing ashore Sable Island.

On land, the storm extensively damaged fruit trees and crops in some areas of Nova Scotia, especially in Truro. Several homes were left without telephone service in Chester after lightning struck several poles. A few homes were damaged by lightning in the town, while a home and a shed were destroyed by lightning in Kemptville. High winds in Newfoundland also interrupted telegraph communications. In New Brunswick,  of rainfall was observed Fredericton, the highest precipitation total recorded from the hurricane.

With at least 55 fatalities, the hurricane was the deadliest in Canada since a hurricane in 1900. The system also ranks as the third deadliest Canadian tropical cyclone of the 20th century, behind only a hurricane in 1927 and the remnants of Hurricane Hazel in 1954. After the storm, Lunenburg Progress Enterprise publisher William Duff was one of few people calling for schooners to be supplied with transmission and receiving radio equipment, while there were a few requests for a rescue ship to be stationed at the fishing banks on standby should other ships become distressed. However, little was done to improve mitigation prior to the hurricane in August 1927. In Nova Scotia, the families of the victims of the storm received monetary compensation via the Workplace Safety & Insurance Board. The agency became severely depleted of funds, leading the board to announce a 5% increase in insurance rates for the fishing industry. Captains and vessel owners responded by threatening to go on strike, forcing the board to reverse their decision.

See also

List of Canada hurricanes
1927 Nova Scotia hurricane
Hurricane Bill (2009)
Hurricane Earl (2010)

References

External links
Best Track data on the 1926 Hurricane
Canadian Hurricane Centre

Nova Scotia Hurricane
Category 3 Atlantic hurricanes
Hurricanes in Canada
Nova Scotia Hurricane
1926 in Nova Scotia
Natural disasters in Nova Scotia
1926 disasters in Canada